Ondřej Polívka (born May 17, 1988 in Prague) is a modern pentathlete from the Czech Republic. He competed at the 2012 Summer Olympics in London, England, along with his teammates David Svoboda, who eventually won a gold medal in the men's event, and his girlfriend Natálie Dianová in the women's event. During the men's competition, Polívka made a disastrous start, with a disappointing score in one-touch épée fencing, but managed to keep his pace in swimming and horse-riding. His best competition result happened in a first ever combined running and pistol shooting, where he set two Olympic records for hitting five shots each in three sessions, with a score of 33.6 target points. Polívka finished the last segment in fourth place, despite his staggered start with a handicapped time and his accomplishment in laser pistol; however, he finished the event only in fifteenth place.

In his sporting career, Polívka took part in several modern pentathlon competitions, and won medals at the World and European Championships. He also led his strong Czech team, including Svoboda and Michal Michalík to claim both gold and silver medals at the 2009 World Modern Pentathlon Championships in London.

References

External links
  
 

Czech male modern pentathletes
1988 births
Living people
Olympic modern pentathletes of the Czech Republic
Modern pentathletes at the 2012 Summer Olympics
Sportspeople from Prague
World Modern Pentathlon Championships medalists